The United States District Court for the Eastern District of Pennsylvania (in case citations, E.D. Pa.) is one of the original 13 federal judiciary districts created by the Judiciary Act of 1789. It originally sat in Independence Hall in Philadelphia as the United States District Court for the District of Pennsylvania, and is now located at the James Byrne Courthouse at 601 Market Street in Philadelphia. There are Eastern District federal courtrooms in Philadelphia, Lancaster, Allentown, Reading, and Easton.

The Court's jurisdiction includes Philadelphia, as well as Berks, Bucks, Chester, Delaware, Lancaster, Lehigh, Montgomery and Northampton counties. The district is a part of the Third Circuit, and appeals are taken to that Circuit (except for patent claims and claims against the U.S. government under the Tucker Act, which are appealed to the Federal Circuit).

The chief judge for the Eastern Pennsylvania District Court is Juan Ramon Sánchez.

The people in the district are represented by the United States Attorney for the Eastern District of Pennsylvania. , the U.S. Attorney is Jacqueline C. Romero.

History 

The United States District Court for the District of Pennsylvania was one of the original 13 courts established by the Judiciary Act of 1789, on September 24, 1789. At the time of its initial subdivision, presiding judge Richard Peters Jr. was reassigned to only the Eastern District.

Current judges 

:

Vacancies and pending nominations

Former judges

Chief judges

Succession of seats

List of U.S. Attorneys 
 William Lewis (1789–1791)
 William Rawle (1791–1799)
 Jared Ingersoll (1800–1801)
 Alexander Dallas (1801–1814)
 Charles Jared Ingersoll (1815–1829)
 George M. Dallas (1829–1831)
 Henry D. Gilpin (1831–1837)
 John M. Read (1837–1841)
 William M. Meredith (1841–1842)
 Henry M. Watts (1842–1845) 
 Thomas M. Pettit (1845–1849)
 John W. Ashmead (1849–1854)
 James C. Van Dyke (1854–1857)
 George M. Wharton (1857–1860) 
 George A. Coffey (1861–1864) 
 Charles Gilpin (1864–1868) 
 John P. O'Neil (1868–1869) 
 Aubrey H. Smith (1869–1873) 
 William McMichael (1873–1875) 
 John K. Valentine (1875–1888) 
 John R. Read (1888–1892) 
 Ellery P. Ingham (1892–1896)
 James M. Beck (1896–1900)
 James Buchanan Holland (1900–1904)
 Joseph Whitaker Thompson (1904–1912)
 John C. Smartley (1912–1913) 
 Francis F. Kane (1913–1919) 
 Charles D. McAvoy (1920–1921) 
 George W. Coles (1921–1929) 
 Calvin S. Boyer (1929–1930) 
 Howard B. Lewis (Acting) (1931)
 Edward W. Wells (1931–1933) 
 Charles D. McAvoy (Second Time) (1933–1937) 
 Guy K. Bard (Acting) (1937)
 James Cullen Ganey (1937–1940)
 Edward A. Kallick (Acting) (1940) 
 Gerald A. Gleeson (1940–1953) 
 Joseph G. Hildenberger (Acting) (1953)
 W. Wilson White (1953–1957) 
 G. Clinton Fogwell, Jr. (Acting) (1957)
 Harold Kenneth Wood (1957–1959)
 Joseph Leo McGlynn, Jr. (Acting) (1959) 
 Walter E. Alessandroni (1959–1961) 
 Joseph Simon Lord III (1961) 
 Drew J. T. O'Keefe (1961–1969) 
 Louis C. Bechtle (1969–1972)
 Carl Joseph Melone (Acting) (1972)
 Robert E. J. Curran (1972–1976) 
 Jonas Clayton Undercofler III (Acting) (1976)
 David W. Marston (1976–1978)
 Robert N. DeLuca (Acting) (1978) 
 Peter F. Vaira, Jr. (1978–1983)
 Edward S. G. Dennis, Jr. (1983–1988)
 Michael M. Baylson (1988–1993)
 Michael J. Rotko (Acting) (1993)
 Michael R. Stiles (1993–2001)
 Michael L. Levy (Acting) (2001)
 Pat Meehan (2001–2008)
 Laurie Magid (Acting) (2008–2009)
 Michael L. Levy (Acting, Second Time) (2009–2010)
 Zane David Memeger (2010–2016)
 Louis D. Lappen (Acting) (2016–2018)
 William M. McSwain (2018–2021)
 Jennifer Arbittier Williams (Acting) (2021–2022)
 Jacqueline C. Romero (2022–present)

See also 
 Courts of Pennsylvania
 List of current United States district judges
 List of United States federal courthouses in Pennsylvania

Notes

External links 
 Official site
 
 

1818 establishments in Pennsylvania
Pennsylvania, Eastern District
Buildings and structures in Philadelphia
Pennsylvania law
Government of Philadelphia
Allentown, Pennsylvania
Reading, Pennsylvania
Easton, Pennsylvania
Courthouses in Pennsylvania
Courts and tribunals established in 1818